Muro, a word meaning wall in the Spanish, Portuguese Italian, Esperanto and Ido languages, may refer to:

Places

France
 Muro, Haute-Corse, a commune in the département of Haute-Corse

Italy
 Muro Leccese, a municipality of the Province of Lecce, Apulia
 Muro Lucano, a municipality of the Province of Potenza, Basilicata

Japan
 Muro, Nara, (室生村; Murō-mura), a village located in Uda District, Nara Prefecture
 Muro District, Kii, (牟婁郡; Muro-gun), in Kii Province, present-day Wakayama Prefecture and Mie Prefecture

Spain
 Muro, Mallorca, a town
 Muro de Alcoy, a town in the province of Alicante
 Muros, A Coruña, a town in the province of A Coruña
 Muros (comarca), a comarca in the province of A Coruña
 Muros de Nalón, a municipality in the province of Asturias

People 
 Muro (DJ), hip hop artist from Tokyo
 Il Muro, Italian nickname for Walter Samuel (born 1978), Argentinian footballer
 Adrián Muro (born 1995), Mexican footballer

Other 
 Murō-ji, a temple on a mountain southeast of Nara, Japan.
 deviantArt Muro, an HTML5 drawing application
 Muro: Damn the Humanist Inside (Turkish: Muro: Nalet Olsun İçimdeki İnsan Sevgisine), an 2008 Turkish comedy film

See also
Muros (disambiguation)
Muras (disambiguation)